Anne Odenmarck (born 7 July 1955) is a Norwegian politician for the Labour Party.

She served as a deputy representative to the Parliament of Norway from Akershus during the term 2013–2017. She has led the Labour caucus in Ås municipal council since 1991 and been a member of Akershus county council.

References

1955 births
Living people
People from Ås, Akershus
Deputy members of the Storting
Labour Party (Norway) politicians
Akershus politicians
Women members of the Storting